The 1940 Belfast East by-election was held on 8 February 1940.  The by-election was held due to the elevation to the peerage of the incumbent UUP MP, Herbert Dixon.  It was won by the UUP candidate Henry Peirson Harland, who was unopposed.

External links 
A Vision Of Britain Through Time (Constituency elector numbers)

References

1940 elections in the United Kingdom
20th century in Belfast
February 1940 events
East
Unopposed by-elections to the Parliament of the United Kingdom in Northern Irish constituencies
1940 elections in Northern Ireland